William Grainger (5 June 1913 – 4 November 1985) was an Irish Gaelic football player, selector and administrator. He played with club sides Dohenys and Clonakilty, divisional side Carbery and at inter-county level with the Cork senior football team.

Career

Grainger's club career began at minor level with Dohenys in 1930. He quickly progressed to adult level and was part of the Doheny's team that won the Cork JFC title in 1935. Grainger's club performances also earned his selection to the Carbery divisional team that won the Cork SFC title in 1937. He later joined the Clonakilty club and won back-to-back Cork SFC titles in 1946 and 1947.

Grainger first appeared on the inter-county scene with Cork during a two-year stint with the junior team in 1936 and 1937. The latter year also saw him make his first appearance for the senior team. Grainger was at full-back when Cork lost the 1938 Munster final to Kerry. He made his last appearance for the team in 1940. Grainger also lined out with Munster in the Railway Cup.

Retirement and death

In retirement from playing, Grainger was heavily involved in the administrative affairs of the Dohenys club. He also served as chairman of the West Cork Board and was divisional delegate to the Cork County Board. Grainger was also a selector with the Carbery divisional team and with the Dohenys club side that won the Cork JFC title in 1966.

Grainger died at the North Infirmary in Cork on 4 November 1985, at the age of 72.

Honours

Player

Dohenys
Cork Junior Football Championship: 1935
South West Junior A Football Championship: 1931, 1935

Collins
Cork Senior Football Championship: 1946, 1947

Carbery
Cork Senior Football Championship: 1937

Selector

Dohenys
Cork Junior Football Championship: 1966

References

1913 births
1985 deaths
Dohenys Gaelic footballers
Clonakilty Gaelic footballers
Carbery Gaelic footballers
Cork inter-county Gaelic footballers
Munster inter-provincial Gaelic footballers
Gaelic football selectors
Gaelic games administrators